Antonio Mariano Floro Flores (born 18 June 1983) is an Italian former professional footballer who played as a striker and current head coach of Casertana's U17 team.

Career

Early career
Floro Flores was born in Naples and started his career at Napoli. He made his Serie A debut on 28 January 2001 against Roma. After six months on loan to fellow Serie A side Sampdoria, Floro Flores transferred to Perugia after Napoli had gone bankrupt. At Perugia, Floro Flores scored 8 goals in Serie B, and two more against Treviso in the promotion play-off second legs. But Perugia also faced bankruptcy, and Floro Flores joined Arezzo in the summer of 2005. He remained at the club for two seasons and scored 28 goals in 79 league matches.

Udinese
After Arezzo got relegated to Serie C1 in summer 2007, Floro Flores was signed by Udinese in a co-ownership deal. On 25 June 2008, Udinese bought Floro Flores outright. In January 2011, he was loaned to Genoa where he scored 10 goals in 18 matches. In August 2011 he signed a new five-year contract with Udinese. During the summer of 2012 he was sent on loan to Granada in La Liga. On 16 September 2012, Floro Flores scored his first goal for Granada in the 82nd minute against Deportivo to lead his side to a come from behind draw.

Genoa
In January 2013 he left for Genoa for a fee of around €6.3 million, made up of cash plus 50% of the registration rights of Masahudu Alhassan and Alexander Merkel which were valued at €1.5 million and €4 million respectively. However, he only scored 2 goals during the remainder of the season, 10 goals behind team top-scorer Marco Borriello.

In the 2013–14 season, Genoa sold Ciro Immobile and elected not to sign Boriello but Floro Flores found himself behind Alberto Gilardino who had been recalled from loan. Floro Flores was the substitute in the first game of 2013–14 Coppa Italia and the first round of 2013–14 Serie A; in the second round (1 September) Floro Flores was the starting forward. However, he was substituted in the 57th minute, as well as sold on the next day.

Sassuolo
On 2 September 2013, Floro Flores left for Sassuolo on a temporary deal for €1 million with an option to purchase. He retained his no.83 shirt number for his new team.

At the end of season Sassuolo bought Floro Flores and Davide Biondini outright, for €2.5 million and €1.3 million respectively.

Chievo
On 1 February 2016, Floro Flores was signed by Chievo in a temporary deal, replacing Alberto Paloschi. Chievo also had an obligation to buy at the end of season.

Floro Flores was loaned to Bari on 20 January 2017. On 13 July, the loan was renewed.

Casertana
On 29 January 2020, he announced his retirement from playing.

Coaching career
A few months after retiring, on 20 August 2020, Flores was appointed head coach of Casertanas's U17 team, and was simultaneously also appointed as head of the youth sector of the club.

References

External links
Career statistics 

1983 births
Living people
Footballers from Naples
Italian footballers
Association football forwards
Italy under-21 international footballers
S.S.C. Napoli players
U.C. Sampdoria players
A.C. Perugia Calcio players
S.S. Arezzo players
Udinese Calcio players
Genoa C.F.C. players
Granada CF footballers
U.S. Sassuolo Calcio players
A.C. ChievoVerona players
S.S.C. Bari players
Casertana F.C. players
Serie A players
Serie B players
Serie C players
La Liga players
Italian football managers
Italian expatriate footballers
Italian expatriate sportspeople in Spain
Expatriate footballers in Spain